Sabrin Sburlea (born 12 May 1989 in Sânnicolau Mare, Timiș County) is a Romanian footballer who plays as a forward for German amateur side TSV Berg.

On 29 January 2015, Sburlea signed for German 3. Liga side Hansa Rostock until the end of the season.

International career
Sabrin Sburlea played one friendly game at the Cyprus International Football Tournament for Romania, being used by coach Răzvan Lucescu in a 2–2 (2–4, after penalty kicks) loss against Ukraine.

Honours
FC Braşov
Liga II: 2007–08

References

External links

Sabrin Sburlea at Fupa

1989 births
Living people
Association football forwards
Romanian footballers
Romania international footballers
FC Brașov (1936) players
FC Rapid București players
FC Vaslui players
FC Hansa Rostock players
SSVg Velbert players
Liga I players
Liga II players
3. Liga players
Romanian expatriate footballers
Romanian expatriate sportspeople in Germany
Expatriate footballers in Germany
People from Timiș County